The International Lyrics Server was a Swiss website from February 1997 to January 1999, set up by Pascal de Vries to host crowdsourced song lyrics at the site lyrics.ch. By the time it was closed it hosted over 100,000 songs and received a million pageviews per day.

Pascal de Vries said that he did not intend to commercialize the service, but accepted advertising for the stated purpose of helping to cover the costs of running the system. Several music industry companies claimed that he was profiting from their intellectual property; on January 14, 1999, Swiss police seized equipment from his apartment and the service's web host in response to criminal copyright violation complaint filed on behalf of eight music publishing companies including PolyGram and EMI, and the site closed.

References 
 "Nice Guys Finish Last" by Naveen Sunkavally, The Tech, vol. 119, issue 2, February 5, 1999
 "Lyrics Site in Copyright Dispute Is Closed" by Matthew Mirapaul, The New York Times, January 19, 1999

External links
 

Defunct websites
Online music and lyrics databases
Internet services shut down by a legal challenge
Internet properties established in 1997
Internet properties disestablished in 1999
Swiss music websites